Consuelo Valdés Chadwick (born 9 October 1948) is a Chilean politician and archeologist.

References

External links
 

1948 births
Living people
Chilean people
Catholic University of the North alumni
University of Alabama alumni
21st-century Chilean politicians
21st-century Chilean women politicians
Government ministers of Chile
Chilean archaeologists
Women government ministers of Chile
Culture ministers of Chile